Pohjola is a place in Finnish mythology.

Pohjola may also refer to:

Places
 Pohjola, Turku
 3606 Pohjola, asteroid

Surname
 Pohjola (surname), Finnish surname

Companies and groups
 Pohjola Bank, Finnish company, precursor of OP Financial Group
 Pohjola Insurance Company (Palovakuutus-Osakeyhtiö Pohjola), Finnish company, precursor of OP Financial Group
 Pohjola-Norden, Finnish name for Foreningen Norden

Other
 Pohjola Stadion, former name of Myyrmäen jalkapallostadion in Vantaa

See also
 Pohjolan Liikenne, Finnish company
 Pohjolan Sanomat, Finnish newspaper
 Pohjolan Voima, Finnish company